Michael King Fitchett (30 November 1927 – 1 April 2021) was a sportsman who played first-class cricket for Victoria and Australian rules football with Hawthorn during the early 1950s.

Fitchett attended Scotch College, Melbourne. He played regularly for Victoria in the 1951/52 Sheffield Shield season and scored his only first-class hundred in an innings against Western Australia at Perth, his 108 coming from seventh position down the order. From his 13 first-class games he  scored 589 runs at 32.72 and also took nine wickets. He captained Victoria in two matches. His football career lasted three Victorian Football League seasons from 1950 to 1952, playing 30 games and kicking 14 goals.

Fitchett was an outstanding golfer. Metropolitan Golf Club in Oakleigh South has his name on most honour boards as Mens & Mixed Champion, President and Life Member.

See also
 List of Victoria first-class cricketers

References

External links
 
 Cricinfo profile

1927 births
2021 deaths
People educated at Scotch College, Melbourne
People from Hawthorn, Victoria
Hawthorn Football Club players
Old Scotch Football Club players
Australian cricketers
Victoria cricketers
Cricketers from Melbourne
Australian rules footballers from Melbourne